Luis Olaso Anabitarte (15 August 1900 in Villabona, Guipúzcoa – 1982) was a Spanish footballer. 

Olaso played for Atlético Madrid and Real Madrid. He played 4 matches for the Spain national football team from 1921 to 1927. His brother Alfonso also played for Atlético and Spain in the same period.

Honours
Atlético Madrid
Campeonato Regional Centro: 1920-21, 1924–25, 1927–28

Real Madrid
Campeonato Regional Centro: 1929–30, 1930–31, 1931–32, 1932–33
La Liga: 1931-32, 1932–33

External links

 Luis Olaso at Real madrid Legends
Spain stats

1900 births
1982 deaths
Real Madrid CF players
Spanish footballers
Spain international footballers
Association football midfielders
Footballers from the Basque Country (autonomous community)
Atlético Madrid footballers
La Liga players
People from Tolosaldea